Hornnes is a village area in Evje og Hornnes municipality in Agder county, Norway. The village is located within the urban area of Evje, along the river Otra and the Norwegian National Road 9. The village was once separate from Evje, but over the years they have grown together. The Hornnes Church is located on the south end of the village near the lake Breidflå (part of the river Otra).

History
The village of Hornnes was the administrative centre of the old municipalities of Hornnes og Iveland (1838-1886) and of Hornnes (1886-1960). The village grew up on the west shore of the river Otra, at the confluence with the river Dåselva. Today, they are part of the same municipality and the villages have grown together.

Name
The village of Hornnes is named after an old Hornnes farm (Old Norse: Hornnes), since the first Hornnes Church was built there. The first element is horn which means "horn" and the last element is nes which means "headland". So the meaning of Hornnes is "the headland shaped like a horn", probably referring to the small peninsulas on either side of the river Otra as it enters the lake Breidflå.

References

Villages in Agder
Evje og Hornnes